Calvin Colquhoun (born 25 July 1996) is a Scottish professional footballer who plays for Lochee United.

He made his first team debut for Dundee in May 2015, appearing in a 5–0 defeat against Celtic. On 25 November 2016, Colquhoun signed for Scottish League Two side Stirling Albion on loan, initially until January 2017, however, his loan was subsequently extended until the end of the season. At the end of his contract in May 2017, Colquhoun was released by Dundee.
After leaving Dundee, Colquhoun joined Downfield Juniors and worked as a plumber with the Penman Group. In June 2021, Colquhoun signed with Lochee United.

References

External links
 
 

1996 births
Living people
Dundee F.C. players
Stirling Albion F.C. players
Scottish Professional Football League players
Scottish footballers
Association football midfielders
Downfield F.C. players

Lochee United F.C. players